Boonderoo Station, often referred to as Boonderoo, is a pastoral lease that operates as a sheep station.

The ephemeral lake, Lake Boonderoo, from which the property takes its name is situated within the station boundary.

The three leases were for Boonderoo, Kanandah and Koonjarra.

See also
List of ranches and stations

References

Goldfields-Esperance
Pastoral leases in Western Australia
Stations (Australian agriculture)
Nullarbor Plain